A piano sonata is a sonata written for a solo piano. Piano sonatas are usually written in three or four movements, although some piano sonatas have been written with a single movement (Scarlatti, Liszt, Scriabin, Medtner, Berg), others with two movements (Haydn, Beethoven), some contain five (Brahms' Third Piano Sonata) or even more movements. The first movement is generally composed in sonata form.

The Baroque keyboard sonata 
In the Baroque era, the use of the term "sonata" generally referred to either the sonata da chiesa (church sonata) or sonata da camera (chamber sonata), both of which were sonatas for various instruments (usually one or more violins plus basso continuo).  The keyboard sonata was relatively neglected by most composers.

The sonatas of Domenico Scarlatti (of which there are over 500) were the hallmark of the Baroque keyboard sonata, though they were, for the most part, unpublished during Scarlatti's lifetime.  The majority of these sonatas are in one-movement binary form, both sections being in the same tempo and utilizing the same thematic material.  These sonatas are prized for both their technical difficulty and their musical and formal ingenuity.  The influence of Spanish folk music is evident in Scarlatti's sonatas.

Other composers of keyboard sonatas (which were primarily written in two or three movements) include Marcello, Giustini, Durante and Platti.  J.S. Bach's popular Italian Concerto, despite the name, can also be considered a keyboard sonata.

Piano sonatas in the Classical era 
Although various composers in the 17th century had written keyboard pieces which they entitled "Sonata", it was only in the classical era, when the piano displaced the earlier harpsichord and sonata form rose to prominence as a principle of musical composition, that the term "piano sonata" acquired a definite meaning and a characteristic form.

All the well-known Classical era composers, especially Joseph Haydn, Muzio Clementi, Wolfgang Amadeus Mozart, and Ludwig van Beethoven, wrote many piano sonatas. Muzio Clementi wrote more than 110 piano sonatas. He is well known as "The Father of the Pianoforte". Clementi's Opus 2 was the first real piano sonata composed. The much younger Franz Schubert also wrote many.

The 32 sonatas of Ludwig van Beethoven, including the well-known Pathétique Sonata and the Moonlight Sonata, are often considered the pinnacle of piano sonata composition.

Piano sonatas in the Romantic era 
As the Romantic era progressed after Beethoven and Schubert, piano sonatas continued to be composed, but in lesser numbers as the form took on a somewhat academic tinge and competed with shorter genres more compatible with Romantic compositional style. Franz Liszt's comprehensive "three-movements-in-one" Sonata in B minor draws on the concept of thematic transformation first introduced by Schubert in his Wanderer Fantasie of 1822. Piano sonatas have been written throughout the 19th and 20th centuries and up to the present day.

Noted piano sonatas

Classical Era 

 Carl Philipp Emanuel Bach
 Württemberg Sonata No. 1 in A minor, H. 30, Wq. 49/1
 'Prussian' Sonata No. 4 in C minor, Wq. 48/4
 Ludwig van Beethoven
 Piano Sonata No. 1 in F minor, Op. 2 No. 1 
 Piano Sonata No. 4 in E-flat Major, Op. 7 "Grand Sonata"
 Piano Sonata No. 8 in C minor, Op. 13 "Pathétique" 
 Piano Sonata No. 12 in A-flat Major Op. 26 "Funeral March"
 Piano Sonata No. 14 in C-sharp minor, Op. 27 No. 2 "Moonlight"
 Piano Sonata No. 15 in D major, Op. 28 "Pastoral"
 Piano Sonata No. 17 in D minor, Op. 31 No. 2 "Tempest"
 Piano Sonata No. 18 in E-flat major, Op. 31 No. 3 "The Hunt" 
 Piano Sonata No. 19 in G minor, Op. 49 No. 1 
 Piano Sonata No. 20 in G Major, Op. 49 No. 2
 Piano Sonata No. 21 in C Major, Op. 53 "Waldstein"
 Piano Sonata No. 23 in F minor, Op. 57 "Appassionata" 
 Piano Sonata No. 25 in G Major, Op. 79 "Cuckoo" 
 Piano Sonata No. 26 in E-flat Major, Op. 81a "Les Adieux"
 Piano Sonata No. 28 in A Major, Op. 101
 Piano Sonata No. 29 in B-flat Major, Op. 106 "Hammerklavier"
 Piano Sonata No. 30 in E Major, Op. 109
 Piano Sonata No. 31 in A♭ major, Op. 110
 Piano Sonata No. 32 in C minor, Op. 111
 Haydn, Franz Joseph 
 Piano Sonata in E-flat major, Hob. XVI:52
 Mozart, Wolfgang Amadeus
 Piano Sonata No. 3 in B-flat major (K. 281/189f) 
 Piano Sonata No. 5 in G Major (K. 283)
 Piano Sonata No. 10 in C major (K. 330)
 Piano Sonata No. 11 in A major (K. 331/300i)
 Piano Sonata No. 13 in B-flat major (K. 333/315c)
 Piano Sonata No. 14 in C minor (K. 457)
 Piano Sonata No. 16 in C major (K. 545)
 Piano Sonata No. 17 in B-flat major (K. 570)

Romantic 

 Alkan, Charles-Valentin
 Grande sonate 'Les quatre âges'
Brahms, Johannes
Piano Sonata No. 3 in F minor, Op. 5
 Chopin, Frédéric
 Piano Sonata No. 2 in B flat minor, Op. 35, "Funeral March"
 Piano Sonata No. 3 in B minor, Op. 58
 Dukas, Paul
 Piano Sonata in E flat minor
 Grieg, Edvard
 Piano Sonata in E minor, Op. 7
 Liszt, Franz
 Après une lecture du Dante: Fantasia quasi Sonata  (often erroneously referred to as the "Dante Sonata")
 Sonata in B minor
 MacDowell, Edward
 Sonata Tragica, Op. 45
 Sonata Eroica, Op. 50
 Third Sonata, Op. 57
 Fourth Sonata, Op. 59
 Mendelssohn, Fanny
 Ostersonate (Easter Sonata), piano sonata in A major
 Mendelssohn, Felix
 Piano Sonata in E major, Op. 6
 Piano Sonata in G minor, Op. 105
 Piano Sonata in B-flat major, Op. 106
 Rachmaninoff, Sergei
 Piano Sonata No. 1 in D minor, Op. 28
 Piano Sonata No. 2 in B flat minor, Op. 36
 Schubert, Franz, (See List of Schubert's works)
 Piano Sonata No. 13 in A Major, D.664
 Piano Sonata No. 14 in A Minor, D.784
 Piano Sonata No. 18 in G Major,"Fantaisie," D.894
 Piano Sonata No. 19 in C Minor, D.958
 Piano Sonata No. 20 in A Major, D.959
 Piano Sonata No. 21 in B-flat major, D.960
 Schumann, Clara
 Piano Sonata in G minor (1841–42)
 Schumann, Robert
 Piano Sonata No. 1 in F-sharp minor, Op. 11 "Grosse Sonate"
 Piano Sonata No. 2 in G minor, Op. 22
 Piano Sonata No. 3 in F minor, Op. 14 "Concerto without Orchestra"
 Sibelius, Jean
 Piano Sonata in F major, Op. 12
 Weber, Carl Maria von
 Piano Sonata No. 1 in C major, Op. 24 (J. 138)
 Piano Sonata No. 2 in A flat major, Op. 39 (J. 199)
 Piano Sonata No. 3 in D minor, Op. 49 (J. 206)
 Piano Sonata No. 4 in E minor, Op. 70 (J. 287)

Modern (1900-present) 
 Alwyn, William
 Sonata alla Toccata (1945-46)
 Barber, Samuel
 Sonata for Piano, Op. 26
 Barraqué, Jean
 Piano Sonata (1950–52)
 Bartók, Béla
 Piano Sonata, Sz.80
 Bax, Arnold
 Piano Sonata No. 1 (1910)
 Piano Sonata No. 2 (1919)
 Piano Sonata No. 3 (1926)
 Piano Sonata No. 4 in G major (1934)
 Berg, Alban
 Piano Sonata, Op. 1
 Berkeley, Lennox
 Piano Sonata in A major, Op. 20 (1941-45)
 Boulez, Pierre
 Piano Sonata No. 1
 Piano Sonata No. 2
 Piano Sonata No. 3 (Unfinished: only two of the five movements have been published.)
 Bridge, Frank
 Piano Sonata (1921-24)
 Cochran, Julian
 Piano Sonata No. 1
 Piano Sonata No. 2
 Copland, Aaron
 Piano Sonata
 Corea, Chick
 Piano Sonata: The Moon (recorded on Trilogy)
 Dutilleux, Henri
 Piano Sonata, Op. 1
 Fairouz, Mohammed
 Piano Sonata No. 1 "Reflections on Exile"
 Piano Sonata No. 2 "The Last Resistance"
 Ferguson, Howard
 Piano Sonata in F minor, Op. 8 (1938-40)
 Ginastera, Alberto
 Piano Sonata No. 1, Op. 22
Gould, Glenn
Piano Sonata
Habibi, Iman
Piano Sonata (Voyage) (2013)
 Hindemith, Paul
 Piano Sonata No. 1 in A Major "Der Main"
 Piano Sonata No. 2 in G Major
 Piano Sonata No. 3 in B flat Major
 Hough, Stephen
 Sonata for piano (Broken Branches) (2010)
 2nd Piano Sonata (Notturno luminoso) (2012)
 Piano Sonata III (Trinitas) (2014)
 Piano Sonata no. 4 (Vida Breve) (2016)
 Ireland, John
 Piano Sonata (1920)
 Ives, Charles
 Piano Sonata No.2, Concord, Mass., 1840-60
 Janáček, Leoš
 Piano Sonata "1.X.1905"
 Jennings, David
 Piano Sonata, Op. 1 (1988, revised 1995 and 2009)
 Leighton, Kenneth
 Piano Sonata No. 1, Op. 2 (1948)
 Piano Sonata No. 2, Op. 17 (1953)
 Piano Sonata No. 3 Op. 27 (1954)
 Piano Sonata, Op. 64 (1971-72)
 Liebermann, Lowell
 Piano Sonata No. 1, Op. 1 (1977)
 Piano Sonata No.2 ("Sonata Notturna") Op. 10 (1983)
 Piano Sonata No.3 Op. 82 (2002)
 Lilburn, Douglas
 Piano Sonata No. 1 in C minor Op. 1 (1932)
 Piano Sonata No. 3 in F# minor (1939)
 Piano Sonata No. 4 in A minor (1939)
 Piano Sonata No. 5 (1949)
 Piano Sonata No. 6 (1956)
Nikolai Medtner
Piano Sonata No. 1 in F minor, Op. 5 (1901-3)
Piano Sonata No. 2 in A, Op. 11 (1904-7)
Piano Sonata No. 3 in D minor, Sonate-Elegie, Op. 11 (1904-7)
Piano Sonata No. 4 in C, Op. 11 (1904-7)
Piano Sonata No. 5 in G minor, Op. 22 (1909-10)
Piano Sonata No. 6 in C minor, Sonata-Skazka, Op. 22 (1910-11)
Piano Sonata No. 7 in E minor, Night Wind, Op. 22 (1910-11)
Piano Sonata No. 8 in F, Sonata-Ballade, Op. 27 (1912-14)
Piano Sonata No. 9 in A minor, War Sonata , Op. 30 (1914-17)
Piano Sonata No. 10 in A minor, Sonata-reminiscenza, Op. 38 No. 1 (1920)
Piano Sonata No. 11 in C minor, Sonata Tragica, Op. 39, No. 5 (1920)
Piano Sonata No. 12 in B minor, Romantica, Op. 53 No. 1 (1930)
Piano Sonata No. 13 in F minor, Minacciosa, Op. 53, No. 2 (1930)
Piano Sonata No. 14 in G, Sonata-Idyll, Op. 56 (1937)
 Ornstein, Leo
 Piano Sonata No. 4
 Piano Sonata No. 8
 Pejačević, Dora
 Sonata in B flat minor, Op. 36 (1914; dedicated to Anny von Lange)
 Sonata in A flat major, Op. 57 (in one movement; 1921)
 Persichetti, Vincent
 Sonata No. 12 (Mirror Sonata)
 Price, Florence
 Piano Sonata in E Minor
 Prokofiev, Sergei
Piano Sonata No. 3 in A minor, Op. 28 ("From Old Notebooks")
Piano Sonata No. 6 in A major, Op. 82 ("War Sonata 1")
Piano Sonata No. 7 in B-flat major, Op. 83 ("War Sonata 2/Stalingrad")
Piano Sonata No. 8 in B-flat major, Op. 84 ("War Sonata 3")
Rzewski, Frederic
Sonata for Solo Piano
 Schnittke, Alfred
 Piano Sonata No. 1
 Piano Sonata No. 2
 Piano Sonata No. 3
 Scriabin, Alexander
 Piano Sonata No. 2 "Sonata-Fantasy"
 Piano Sonata No. 4
 Piano Sonata No. 5
 Piano Sonata No. 6
 Piano Sonata No. 7 "White Mass"
 Piano Sonata No. 9 "Black Mass"
 Shostakovich, Dmitri
 Piano Sonata No. 2 in B minor, Op. 61
 Stoker, Richard
 Piano Sonata No.1, Op.26 (1970)
 Piano Sonata No.2, Op.71 (1998)
 Stravinsky, Igor
 Sonata for Piano
 Szymanowski, Karol
 Piano sonata No.2 in A Major op.21
 Piano sonata No.3 op.36
 Tippett, Michael
 Piano Sonata No. 1 (1936-38)
 Piano Sonata No. 2 (1962)
 Piano Sonata No. 3 (1972-73)
 Piano Sonata No. 4 (1983-84)
 Vine, Carl
 Piano Sonata No. 1
 Williams, John
 Piano Sonata (1951)
 Wuorinen, Charles
Piano Sonata (1969)
Second Piano Sonata (1976)
Third Piano Sonata (1986)
Fourth Piano Sonata (2007)